William Wirt Lockwood (1906–1978) was an American academic who was Research Secretary (1935–1940) and Executive Secretary (1941–1943) at the Institute of Pacific Relations. In 1954, he published The Economic Development of Japan, which detailed the transformation of Japan from an agrarian society to one of the world's leading industrial powers.

He was president of the Association for Asian Studies in 1963.

He graduated from DePauw University and Harvard University.

Selected publications
Lockwood, W. W. (1954). The economic development of Japan: Growth and structural change, 1868–1938. Princeton, N.J: Princeton University Press.

Other sources 
Princeton University:The William W. Lockwood Papers: William W. Lockwood 1919–1977 (The archive includes correspondence, minutes, conference reports, records of research projects, and publications documenting the American Institute of Pacific Relations (IPR)

References

1906 births
1978 deaths
Presidents of the Association for Asian Studies
American development economists
DePauw University alumni
Harvard University alumni